Level-coil or pitch-buttock is an old party game played at Christmas in which players have to forfeit their seat to another, often in a boisterous manner.  The name is a corruption of its French name lève-cul, meaning to lift the buttocks.

See also
Musical chairs
Buggins' turn

References

Party games